Amra Đapo (born 30 December 1976) is a former Croatian female professional basketball player.

External links
Profile at fiba.com
Profile at eurobasket.com

1976 births
Living people
Basketball players from Sarajevo
Croatian women's basketball players
Shooting guards
Small forwards
Mediterranean Games gold medalists for Croatia
Mediterranean Games medalists in basketball
Competitors at the 1997 Mediterranean Games